This is a list of tennis venues to have held a notable tournament, sorted by country.

Argentina

Australia

Austria

Belarus

Belgium

Bosnia

Brazil

Canada

Chile

China

Croatia

Czech Republic

Denmark

Ecuador

France

Germany

Great Britain

Greece

Hungary

India

Indonesia

Israel

Italy

Japan

Mexico

Netherlands

New Zealand

Poland

Portugal
Estoril Court Central

Puerto Rico
Mayagüez University Campus Tennis Courts Central American and Caribbean Games (2010)

Qatar

Russia

Serbia

South Africa

South Korea

Spain

Sweden

Switzerland

Thailand

Ukraine

United Arab Emirates

United States

Uzbekistan

See also 
List of tennis stadiums by capacity

References

Tennis courts
Venues